Decoupling is a behavioral self-help intervention for body-focused and related behaviors (DSM-5) such as trichotillomania, onychophagia (nail biting), skin picking and lip-cheek biting. The user is instructed to modify the original dysfunctional behavioral path by performing a counter-movement shortly before completing the self-injurious behavior (e.g. biting nails, picking skin, pulling hair). This is intended to trigger an irritation, which enables the person to detect and stop the compulsive behavior at an early stage. A systematic review from 2012 suggested some efficacy of decoupling, which was corroborated by Lee et al.  in 2019. Whether or not the technique is superior to other behavioral interventions such as habit reversal training awaits to be tested. Decoupling is a variant of habit reversal training.

References

External links 

 "Decoupling – A Technique to Reduce Hair Pulling (Trichotillomania) and Nail Biting", a free manual

Psychotherapies
Body-focused repetitive behavior